Pawłowa  is a village in the administrative district of Adamówka, within Przeworsk County, Rzeszów Voivodeship, in central Poland.

References

Villages in Przeworsk County